eServGlobal develops mobile software to support mobile financial services, with a focus on emerging markets. It also has a 35.7% share in the HomeSend cross-border payments hub, alongside Mastercard.

The company also developed a platform called PayMobile which covers a spectrum of mobile financial services, including mobile wallet, mobile commerce, analytics, advanced recharge, promotions and agent management.

References 

Mobile payments